Jonathan Edward Hugh Sorrell (born August 1977) is the president of the global asset management firm, Capstone Investment Advisors.

Early life
Sorrell was born in August 1977, the son of advertising man Sir Martin Sorrell. He graduated from the University of Cambridge with a degree in law.

Career
After university, Sorrell joined Goldman Sachs, as did his brothers Mark and Robert, as a managing director working in the investment banking, investment management and securities divisions in London and New York. Sorrell led investment banking coverage of asset management companies in EMEA, and then managed the Goldman Sachs Petershill Fund, a vehicle investing in hedge fund management companies.

Sorell joined Man Group in 2011 as head of strategy and corporate finance, where he was soon appointed chief financial officer responsible for finance, tax, internal audit, operations, technology and human resources. He later held roles as president and was a director, responsible for global sales and marketing, investment businesses operating in private markets and fund of hedge fund solutions, and group M&A and strategy.

In September 2019, Sorrell announced he was leaving Man Group, to join Capstone Investment Advisors as president.

Appointments
Sorrell was chairman of the board of governors of The Granville School in Sevenoaks, Kent, an independent preparatory school, and a director of The Ena Makin Educational Trust which runs the school.

In August 2020 he co-founded 100 Black Interns, a programme designed to help address the underrepresentation of Black talent in the investment management industry. This was followed by the launch of 10,000 Black Interns in 2021 which expanded the initiative to over 20 different sectors.

References

1977 births
Living people
English people of Jewish descent
English people of Russian descent
English people of Romanian descent
English people of Polish descent
Alumni of the University of Cambridge
British businesspeople
Chief financial officers